Delirium Wilderness is a  wilderness area in Chippewa County, within the Hiawatha National Forest in the U.S. state of Michigan.

The wilderness is forested and flat-to-rolling, with its lower reaches often characterized as a swamp.  Elevations range from 590 to 890 feet (180 to 270 m).  Sculpted by glaciers and an ancient glacial lake, it now contains the  Sylvester Pond and the  Delirium Pond, as well as parts of the headwaters of the Pine and Waiska Rivers.

Vegetation
Delirium Wilderness is thickly forested with swamp conifer, aspen, and white cedar, with stands of red and jack pine growing in its drier areas.

Wildlife
Wildlife predominant in the Delirium Wilderness includes beaver, bobcat, otter, wolf, various species of duck, loon, great blue heron, and sandhill crane.  Whitetail deer, black bear, and rabbit are also found in the area.

See also
 Protected areas of Michigan
 List of U.S. Wilderness Areas
 Wilderness Act

References

External links
 Delirium Wilderness - Hiawatha National Forest
 Delirium Wilderness - Wilderness.net

Protected areas of Chippewa County, Michigan
IUCN Category Ib
Wilderness areas of Michigan
Hiawatha National Forest